The Screen Gems Network (SGN) was an American afternoon television program which ran in syndication from September 20, 1999 to September 9, 2002, launched by Columbia TriStar Television Distribution and produced by Evolution. The concept for the program was announced on January 11, 1999 and it aired on September 20, 1999.  SGN was the first broadcast-based service airing classic shows from the Columbia Pictures Television vault airing shows with an resource base of 58,000 episodes of 350 television series from the 1950s to 1980s from those by Columbia Pictures Television, Tandem Productions, and ELP Communications. The announcer of the program was Billy West. He was tapped by CTTD to be the announcer for the program on August 11, 1999.

Programs were creatively grouped for theme weeks such as "Love is in the Air", "Pilots", "Best Music Videos" and "Before They Were Stars". Holiday based theme weeks include promotions for Halloween, Christmas, Mother's Day and Father's Day, among others.

List of series aired

Screen Gems
Father Knows Best (1954-1960)
The Donna Reed Show (1958-1966)
Hazel (1961-1966)
Bewitched (1964-1972)
I Dream of Jeannie (1965-1970)
Gidget (1965-1966)
The Monkees (1966-1968)
Here Come the Brides (1968-1970)
The Partridge Family (1970-1974)
The Flying Nun (1967-1970)

Columbia Pictures Television
Starsky & Hutch (1975-1979)
Charlie's Angels (1976-1981)
What's Happening!! (1976-1979)
Fantasy Island (1977-1984)
Benson (1979-1986)
What's Happening Now!! (1985-1988)

Tandem Productions
All in the Family (1971-1979)
Maude (1972-1978)
Sanford and Son (1972-1977)
Good Times (1974-1979)
Diff'rent Strokes (1978-1986)

ELP Communications
The Jeffersons (1975-1985)
One Day at a Time (1975-1984)
The Facts of Life (1979-1988)
Silver Spoons (1982-1987)

Paired series
Bewitched & I Dream of JeannieThe Partridge Family & The MonkeesThe Jeffersons & Benson''

References

Television series by Sony Pictures Television
Television series by Evolution Film & Tape
1999 American television series debuts
2002 American television series endings
First-run syndicated television programs in the United States
Television programming blocks
Television syndication packages